The men's 400 metres was an Olympic event for the fourth time at the 1908 Summer Olympics in London. The competition was held from July 21, 1908, to July 23, 1908. The rerun of the final was held on July 25, 1908. The races were held on a track of 536.45 metres= mile in circumference.

37 runners from 11 nations competed. NOCs could enter up to 12 athletes.

It was the most controversial event of the London Games: the final resulted in the disqualification of American runner John Carpenter who was accused by the British officials of a manoeuvre that was legal under American rules (under which Carpenter normally competed) but prohibited by the British rules under which the race was run.

As part of the disqualification of Carpenter, a second final race was ordered, with Halswelle to face the other two finalists again. These athletes, William Robbins and John Taylor, were both Americans, and they boycotted the re-run final to protest the judges' decision.

Thus, Halswelle was the only medallist in the 400 metres.

Background

This was the fourth time the event was held. Only one of the runners from 1904, Paul Pilgrim of the United States, returned. Defending gold medalist Harry Hillman, also American, was in London but competed only in the hurdles. The favorite was British runner Wyndham Halswelle, the 1905, 1906, and 1908 AAA champion.

Belgium, Sweden, and the Netherlands appeared in the event for the first time. The United States made its fourth appearance in the event, the only nation to compete in it at the first four Olympic Games.

Competition format

The competition consisted of three rounds. The first round had 16 heats, ranging from 0 to 4 runners (the second heat was cancelled because no athletes started). Only the top runner in each heat advanced to the semifinals. The semifinal was to consist of 4 heats of 4 runners each, but the final heat had only 3 runners due to the cancellation of the second heat in the first round. Again, only the top runner in each semifinal heat advanced, making a four-man final.

Records

These were the standing world and Olympic records (in seconds) prior to the 1908 Summer Olympics.

(*) 440 yards (= 402.34 m)

(**) This track was 536.45 metres= mile in circumference.

In the semi-finals Wyndham Halswelle set a new Olympic record with 48.4 seconds.

Schedule

Results

Heats

The heats were run on July 21, 1908. The winner of each advanced to the semifinals, with all other runners eliminated.

Heat 1

Montague led by twelve yards when he finished.

Heat 2

The second heat was scratched as there were no starters.

Heat 3

Ryle had no competition in the third heat.

Heat 4

Taylor won by twelve yards.

Heat 5

Nicol won easily, holding a twelve-yard lead over Guttormsen as he crossed the finish line.

Heat 6

Eight yards separated the two runners when Malfait crossed the line.

Heat 7

Robbins had no difficulty in this race, leading from start to finish to win by six yards.

Heat 8

Prout's lead was only two yards when he finished.

Heat 9

Ramey's victory was one of the closest of the first round, with only a yard and a half separating him from Astley.

Heat 10

Jacquemin took an early lead, but pulled up lame, allowing Sebert to win by 20 yards.

Heat 11

Heat 12

Heat 13

Heat 14

Heat 15

Heat 16

Young won by 30 yards.

Semifinals

The semifinals were held on July 22, 1908. Winners advanced, all others were eliminated.

Semifinal 1

Carpenter led throughout, with Davies challenging him at the end. Carpenter was "slowing fast in the last thirty yards" but managed to hold off Davies and win "by three yards."

Semifinal 2

Halswelle broke the Olympic record in this semifinal. He took the lead early and "was right away at the half distance," ultimately winning "by 12 yards."

Semifinal 3

Malfait took the lead at the start. Taylor caught him at 300 yards.

Semifinal 4

Sebert started slow, but then lengthened his stride to pass Atlee and nearly catch Robbins, who held him off to win "by 3 yards."

Final

The final was initially held on July 23, 1908. After the disqualification of Carpenter, a re-run of the final was scheduled for July 25.

 First running

The first final ended with Carpenter winning ahead of Halswelle with Robbins in third, and Taylor last. 

Roscoe Badger, one of the British umpires of the event, noticed Carpenter had maneuvered so as to prevent Halswelle from passing him; this was legal at the time under the American rules under which Carpenter normally competed, but prohibited by the British rules that were in effect for the Olympics. 

Badger therefore signalled to the judges to declare the race null and void: his decision led to a thirty-minute argument between British and American team members.

At the official inquiry later that day, the judges upheld Badger's complaint, and Carpenter was disqualified. It was also ordered that the final be re-run with Carpenter excluded.

 Second running

After the judges ruled that Carpenter was disqualified and barred from starting in the re-run, Robbins and Taylor withdrew in disgust. 

Halswelle, now assured of the gold medal, won in the only walkover in Olympic track and field history.

References

 
 
 

Men's 0400 metres
400 metres at the Olympics